William "Scotty" Barnhart (born October 27, 1964) is an American jazz trumpeter.  A two-time Grammy winner, he has played since 1993 as a featured soloist with Count Basie Orchestra. In September 2013, Barnhart was announced as the new director of the Basie Orchestra. He has multiple recordings with pianist Marcus Roberts, as well as recordings with Tony Bennett, Diana Krall, Ray Charles, and Tito Puente.  A solo CD, released with Unity Music, is titled Say It Plain and features Clark Terry, Ellis and Wynton Marsalis, Marcus Roberts, Jamie Davis and Etienne Charles; it achieved number 3 in the Jazz Charts.  Also active as an educator and clinician, he is author of The World of Jazz Trumpet - A Comprehensive History and Practical Philosophy (published by Hal Leonard).  He is a professor in the College of Music at Florida State University.

He was born in Atlanta, Georgia and was a member of the historic Ebeneezer Baptist Church where he was christened by Martin Luther King Jr.

References

Further reading
Scotty Barnhart. All About Jazz.
Official website

Florida State University faculty
American jazz trumpeters
American male trumpeters
Musicians from Atlanta
Florida A&M University alumni
Living people
1964 births
21st-century trumpeters
21st-century American male musicians
American male jazz musicians